Brad Hunt is an American actor, singer and songwriter, born in Moberly, Missouri.

Filmography

Film

Television

External links

American male film actors
Living people
People from Moberly, Missouri
Male actors from Missouri
Year of birth missing (living people)